Farmington High School is a public school located in Farmington, Utah, United States. It is owned and operated by the Davis School District. The school name is the Farmington Phoenix (or Phoenices, the plural form of phoenix). It opened during the 2018–19 school year and is the newest high school in Davis School District.

History
In the Fall of 2015, a voter approved bond of $298 million was set aside to alleviate crowding at Davis and Viewmont High Schools. After a controversial boundary drawing process and mascot name the school was completed July 2018 under budget and on time. 

Farmington opened during the 2018–19 school year. It opened as a 5A school and without seniors. The football team during the first year had an 8–2 record and finished 3rd in 5A Region 5. The Farmington Boys Basketball team finished with a 14–10 record in 5A Region 5.

Awards
Farmington has won multiple theater and basketball related awards, in addition to the construction project that built it.It also was runner-up in the 2022 Girl's Soccer 6A State Championship game.

Alumni 
Collin Chandler: Winner of Utah's Mr. Basketball Gatorade and Deseret News player of the year awards and a top 26 college basketball recruit nationwide.

References

External links
 

Public high schools in Utah
Schools in Davis County, Utah
2018 establishments in Utah
Educational institutions established in 2018